Bergleder is a German term, literally meaning "mine leather", and may refer to:

 miner's apron, an item of miner's clothing
 one of the minerals actinolite or tremolite